Institute of Sacred Music could refer to:

 Pontifical Institute of Sacred Music, in Rome.
 Yale Institute of Sacred Music, at the Union Theological Seminary in New York